Kinnerley is a civil parish in Shropshire, England.  It contains 29 listed buildings that are recorded in the National Heritage List for England.  Of these, one is at Grade II*, the middle of the three grades, and the others are at Grade II, the lowest grade.  The parish contains the village of Kinnerley and smaller settlements, and is mainly rural.  Most of the listed buildings are houses, cottages, farmhouses and farm buildings, many of which are timber framed.  The other listed buildings include a church and items in the churchyard, a public house, a small country house, and a bridge.


Key

Buildings

References

Citations

Sources

Lists of buildings and structures in Shropshire